Krishnarao Jaisim is an architect and the former  chairman of the Indian Institute of Architects, Karnataka Chapter. His work has been featured in The New York Times, The Hindu, The Times of India, The Deccan Herald, and on HGTV.

Career
Jaisim attended Madras Christian College School (1960 batch). He completed his university education in architecture in 1966, from Madras University. From 1966 to 1970, he worked with the architectural firm of LM Chitale & Son, Madras.

In 1970, inspired by Ayn Rand's novel, The Fountainhead, he started an architecture practice under the name "Jaisim-Fountainhead". The practice grew from 1970 to 1975, winning a National Competition for the Cochin Stadia, Presidents Nomination for the Small Industries Pavilion and the ‘TAJ Fisherman’s Cove’. From 1975 to 1980, the firm began working overseas, and ventured into other areas of building, such as the import and distribution of building materials, running scheduled contracts, and running a stone crusher and fabrication unit. In 1980 he returned to India and settled in Bangalore.

Personal life
Jaisim was married 1970 to Geeta (now President of University Women s Association). He has a daughter, Ashwini Jaisim

Awards and positions
Chairman s Award - one of the prestigious awards (only two other have relieved this before)
CIVIL AWARD - for contribution by an Architect to Civil and Structural Engineering in the built environment for innovative practices. 
J K Award– Architect of the Year 1992
Outstanding Contribution to the Interior Architecture – Durian Society Interiors Design Award 2004
International Gold Star Millennium Award –2007 – International conference on Indo – Nepal Friendship & Economic Co-operation at Kathmandu
Life Time Achievement Award 2007 for Outstanding Performance in the field of Architecture awarded by PAA
Convener the Indian Institute of Architects – National Convention in Bangalore
Convener – Workshop on Innovative, Cost & Energy Effective Construction Methods and Systems
Chairman - Indian Institute of Architects – Karnataka chapter
Fellow - United Writer's Association
Fellow - Indian society of lighting engineers
Fellow – The Indian Institution of Valuers, India
Registered - Council of Architecture
Charter President – Rotary Club – Cubbon Park
Past President – Practicing Architects Association
Member (Treasurer) - Board of Governors –INSTRUCT
Professor (Design chair) – BMS College – Dept. of Architecture
Visiting Professor to Colleges of Architecture
Adjunct Professor – M.I.T

References

External links
Interview in The Hindu
Article in The New York Times
Article in The Hindu
Official Site
Interview with Know Your Star
Interview With ZingyHomes

Council of Architecture
JAISIM FOUNTAINHEAD PROJECTS PRIVATE LIMITED

20th-century Indian architects
Architecture firms of India
Living people
Year of birth missing (living people)